AFLC may refer to:
 Air Force Logistics Command
 American Football League of China
 Antiferroelectric liquid crystal
 Association of Free Lutheran Congregations